Domenico Luigi Valeri (20 August 1701 - post 1746) was an Italian painter and architect active in Marche.

Biography
He was born in Jesi. He painted canvases for the church of Santa Maria di Piazza in Serrapetrona. He died in Camerino.

Among his architectural projects, was the Arco Clementino, the Teatro del Leone, and the choir of the church of San Settimio, all in Jesi. The fountain (1762) in front of the City Hall of Assisi is attributed to Valeri.

Among his paintings: 
 Birth of the Virgin (1742), chiesa dell’Adorazione, Jesi
 Judith, Solomon, Sacrifice of Jephthah, and Judgement of Solomon (1728), former Seminary in  piazza Federico II, Jesi
 Santa Scolastica, Sant Anna, Jesi
 Palazzo Ghisleri, Jesi
 Chiesa dei cappuccini, Jesi
 Madonna with Child with Angels and Saints Anne, John the Baptist and Carlo Borromeo (after 1765), Chiesa del Rosario, Pievebovigliana
 San Fedele da Sigmaringa, all’isolato Carducci
 Glory of St Joseph, Vallesina, Monsano 
 Church ovals, Santa Maria, Monsano
 Frescoes'', chiesetta  Santa Maria della Castellaretta, Staffolo

References

1701 births
1746 deaths
18th-century Italian painters
Italian male painters
People from Iesi
18th-century Italian male artists